Wesley Eugene Fesler (June 29, 1908 – July 30, 1989) was an American football, basketball, and baseball player and coach of football and basketball.  He was a three-sport athlete at Ohio State University and a consensus first-team selection to the College Football All-America Team three straight years (1928–1930). Fesler was later the head football coach at Wesleyan University (1941–1942), the University of Pittsburgh (1946), Ohio State (1947–1950), and the University of Minnesota (1951–1953), compiling a career record of 41–40–8.  He was also the head basketball coach at Harvard University (1933–1941), Wesleyan (1941–1944) and Princeton University (1945–1946), tallying a mark of 78–139.  Fesler was inducted into the College Football Hall of Fame as a player in 1954.

Playing career
Fesler came to Ohio State from Youngstown, Ohio. At Ohio State, Fesler was a member of both Pi Kappa Alpha and Phi Beta Kappa, earning a total of nine varsity letters in baseball, basketball, and football. He was a charter inductee in the Ohio State Varsity O Hall of Fame in 1977.

Football
Many believe Fesler's greatest talents were in football. He primarily played end and was a consensus first-team All-America selection in 1928 and 1929 and a unanimous first-team All-America selection in 1930. Depending on the game situation, he would sometimes move into the backfield as a fullback. In 1930, he was voted the Most Valuable Player in the Big Ten.

Jock Sutherland, the University of Pittsburgh coach, called Fesler "a one man team. It is unbelievable how that boy can do so many things." In 1939 Grantland Rice listed Fesler at end on his all-time college football team. Fesler was inducted into the College Football Hall of Fame in 1954.

In 1934, high-speed photographer "Doc" Edgerton took the now-classic photograph "Wes Fesler Kicking a Football." The stroboscope photograph demonstrated the dent in the ball at the point of contact.

Basketball
In basketball Fesler was a guard. He was the basketball captain as a junior in the Spring of 1930, and the football captain as a senior in the Autumn of that year. He was Ohio State's first consensus first-team All-America selection in basketball in 1931.

Coaching career
Fesler ignored interest from teams of the National Football League and instead pursued a career in coaching. He began his coaching career as an assistant to his Ohio State football coach, Sam Willaman, in 1931 and 1932. In 1933, Fesler accepted an offer from Harvard University as head coach of the basketball team and backfield coach of the football team. He stayed at Harvard until 1941. His stint at Harvard turned out to be the longest tenure of his career.

In 1941, Fesler accepted an offer from Wesleyan University to be the head coach of their football team.  Unfortunately, the Wesleyan football program was interrupted after the 1942 season by World War II.  In 1945, Fesler accepted an offer from Princeton as head basketball coach and assistant football coach.  He later became the head football coach at the University of Pittsburgh in 1946. In 1947, he became the head coach at Ohio State. He resigned on December 9, 1950, citing "excessive pressure for winning football games". After leaving Ohio State, he became head coach at the University of Minnesota from 1951–1953.

Fesler's 1949 Ohio State team was the Big Ten Conference co-champion and beat California in the Rose Bowl.  Fesler developed the talents of 1950 Heisman Trophy winner Vic Janowicz at Ohio State and two-time Big Ten MVP Paul Giel at Minnesota.

Fesler had a stronger record as a football coach than as a basketball coach. His combined record as a major college football head coach, at Pitt, Ohio State, and Minnesota, was 34–31–8.  His combined record as basketball head coach at Harvard and Princeton was 67–108.

Head coaching record

Football

References

External links
 

1908 births
1989 deaths
American football ends
American men's basketball players
Guards (basketball)
Ohio State Buckeyes football players
Ohio State Buckeyes baseball players
Ohio State Buckeyes men's basketball players
Ohio State Buckeyes football coaches
Minnesota Golden Gophers football coaches
Pittsburgh Panthers football coaches
Harvard Crimson men's basketball coaches
Princeton Tigers men's basketball coaches
Princeton Tigers football coaches
Wesleyan Cardinals football coaches
Wesleyan Cardinals men's basketball coaches
All-American college football players
All-American college men's basketball players
College Football Hall of Fame inductees
Coaches of American football from Ohio
Players of American football from Youngstown, Ohio
Baseball players from Youngstown, Ohio
Basketball coaches from Ohio
Basketball players from Youngstown, Ohio